The McAlester Miners were a minor league baseball team based in McAlester, Oklahoma, that existed on-and-off from 1907 to 1926. In 1907, they played in the Oklahoma–Arkansas–Kansas League, in 1908 they played in the Oklahoma–Kansas League, in 1912 they played in the Oklahoma State League, and from 1914 to 1917, in 1922 and in 1926 they played in the Western Association.

League championships
Throughout their history, they won one league championship – in 1917, under manager Jimmie Humphries. That year, they finished first in the league with a 95–57 record.

Notable alumni

Baseball Hall of Fame alumni

 Deacon White (1907) Inducted, 2013

Notable alumni
 Harry Coveleski (1922, MGR)
Jimmie Humphries (1917, MGR)
 Roy Johnson (1915)
 Jerry Kane (1912, 1914, MGR)
 Phil Ketter (1915)
 Pryor McBee (1923)
 Rolla Mapel (1916)
 Rollie Naylor (1916)
 Frank Thompson (1916)
 Cotton Tierney (1912)

See also
McAlester Miners players

References

Baseball teams established in 1907
Professional baseball teams in Oklahoma
Sports clubs disestablished in 1926
Pittsburg County, Oklahoma
1907 establishments in Oklahoma
1926 disestablishments in Oklahoma
Defunct baseball teams in Oklahoma
Defunct Western Association teams
Baseball teams disestablished in 1926